Whispering Nickel Idols is a fantasy novel by American writer Glen Cook, the eleventh book in his ongoing Garrett P.I. series.  The series combines elements of mystery and fantasy as it follows the adventures of private investigator Garrett.

Plot introduction
Garrett is a hardboiled detective living in the city of TunFaire, a melting pot of different races, cultures, religions, and species.  When people have problems, they often come to Garrett for help, but trouble has a way of finding Garrett on its own, whether he likes it or not.

Plot summary
Things seemed to be going pretty well for Garrett one morning until he finds a strange kid named Penny Dreadful hanging around his house, gets summoned to a meeting by Harvester Temisk, Chodo Contague's lawyer, and nearly has his door knocked down by an ugly thug wearing green plaid pants.  Garrett meets with Temisk, who fears there are unnatural events occurring associated with Chodo Contague, who may not be as paralyzed as he appears.  Garrett agrees to look into the matter that evening, at a birthday party being held by Belinda Contague for her father.

At the party, when Chodo is introduced to the guests, a number of people mysteriously burst into flames, and in the confusion that follows, Belinda and Chodo somehow get separated.  The whole mess seems to have some connection with the Ugly Pants Gang, who continues to harass Garrett at his home and on the streets.  In addition, Garrett is getting more attention than he likes from subordinate underworld bosses who suspect that Garrett knows where Chodo Contague is hiding.  Garrett can only escape the warring mafia factions for so long, and eventually he is captured, poisoned, and blackmailed by one aspiring leader named Teacher White.

With the help of his friends and the psychic powers of the Dead Man, Garrett survives the worst of the ordeal.  While he rests and recuperates at home, the Dead Man organizes efforts geared towards unraveling the mysteries of the Green Pants Gang, the criminal factions, and the spontaneous combustions.  Compiling the efforts of Garrett's many friends, the Dead Man deduces that the Green Pants Gang is actually a religious faction from outside of TunFaire, and Chodo Contague had at one point worked with the gang to help him rise to the top of the Outfit.

With some clues from the Dead Man, Garrett, Morley, and company track down and capture Harvester Temisk, who had been hiding out with Chodo Contague.  More clever deductive reasoning by the Dead Man reveals a few final plot twists:  Penny Dreadful is in fact Chodo Contague's daughter, Chodo was partially responsible for the previously unexplainable spontaneous combustions, and the Green Pants Gang actually knows the secret to drawing dark emotions out from within the body.  With the help of Garrett and the Dead Man, Chodo's condition improves, so that he is no longer completely physically and mentally impaired.

As a finale, Morley Dotes drops by Garrett's house, with none other than Mr. Big, Garrett's much-despised parrot which had gone missing for some time, perched on his shoulder.

Characters  
Garrett
The Dead Man
Dean
Penny Dreadful
Harvester Temisk
Saucerhead Tharpe
Pular Singe
Morley Dotes
Belinda Contague
Playmate
John Stretch
Chodo Contague
Colonel Westman Block
Deal Relway
Winger
Tinnie Tate

Garrett P.I.
2005 American novels
American fantasy novels